Francis Brengle (November 26, 1807 – December 10, 1846) was an American politician.  Born in Frederick, Maryland, he completed studied law, was admitted to the bar, and commenced practice in that city.  He was a member of the Maryland House of Delegates in 1832, 1834, and 1836, and was elected as a Whig to the Twenty-eighth Congress for Maryland's 2nd congressional district (then comprising Allegany, Frederick and Washington Counties) on February 14, 1844. He served a brief term, losing his seat to Democrat Thomas Johns Perry on October 1, 1845.  He died in Frederick at the age of 39 and is interred in Mount Olivet Cemetery.

References

1807 births
1846 deaths
Members of the Maryland House of Delegates
Politicians from Frederick, Maryland
Whig Party members of the United States House of Representatives from Maryland
Burials at Mount Olivet Cemetery (Frederick, Maryland)
19th-century American politicians